Bernard-Frédéric de Turckheim (3 November 1752 – 10 July 1831) was a French politician.

Mayors of Strasbourg
1752 births
1831 deaths
Members of the Chamber of Deputies of the Bourbon Restoration